Henryk Czapczyk (27 August 1922 – 30 August 2010) was a Polish football player.

Czapczyk was born at Poznań and started his football career at Warta Poznań. He was part of the Warsaw Revolt during World War II. He continued in his quest as a football player, and made his biggest steps in 1946/47 when he became the vice-captain of the team. He stayed at Poznań until 1953, and never repeated this kind of success until his retirement in 1961, when he came back to Poznań to work as a coach.

References

1922 births
2010 deaths
Polish footballers
Lech Poznań players
Polish football managers
Lech Poznań managers
Polish military personnel of World War II
Footballers from Poznań
Association football forwards